Grnčar is a Serbo-Croatian toponym, derived from the word grnčar meaning "potter". It may refer to:

Grnčar, Babušnica, village in Serbia
Grnčar, Klokot, village in Kosovo
Grnčar, Gusinje, village in Montenegro
Grnčar (river in Montenegro)
Grnčar (river in Kosovo)

See also
Grnčari